Decompositions: Volume Number One is the second studio album by American band Circle Takes the Square. The album was released digitally on December 21, 2012 through Gatepost Recordings. Decompositions: Volume Number One is the first studio album released from Circle Takes the Square since 2004's As the Roots Undo.

Release
Circle Takes the Square released the first chapter of Decompositions as a stand-alone, promotional EP on August 23, 2011, and intended to quickly follow up this release with Decompositions: Volume Number One three months later in November 2011. The album was, however, not released until over a year after this projected release date on December 21, 2012 through Gatepost Recordings—coinciding with the alleged 2012 Mayan apocalypse. Decompositions: Volume Number One was originally released digitally through the band's Bandcamp profile with a pay what you want pricing scheme. The limited-time pay what you want price expired upon the release of physical LPs and CDs in January 2013, but has since been reinstated.

Musical style
Brian Shultz of Alternative Press wrote that the band's "self-described bout of 'apocalyptic punk rock'" features "haunting and difficult, almost chokingly dense songwriting that blends practically every type of DIY punk movement of the last two decades and then some into epic, sprawling orchestrations. There are the throat-shredding spasms of early screamo...; grueling, crustcore atmospheres; sludgy, post-metal chugging; erratic, Calculating Infinity-like time changes, dizzying guitar riffs and grindcore drum fills; and even shockingly major-key, inherently melodic folk". According to Doug Moore of Invisible Oranges, the album is more in line with heavy metal than As the Roots Undo in terms of production, and employs elements of hardcore, grind, post-rock, emo and black metal.

Track listing

Personnel 
Circle Takes the Square
 Drew Speziale – vocals, guitar
 Kathy Stubelek – vocals, bass
 David Rabitor – guitar, backing vocals
 Caleb Collins – drums, backing vocals

Production
 Anthony Stubelek – recording, mixing, mastering, production
 Circle Takes the Square – production

References 

2012 albums
Circle Takes the Square albums
Concept albums